is a Japanese trading card game created by Carddas initially based upon Toei's Super Sentai Series television franchise. It was released in 2006 in commemoration of the Super Sentai series' 30th anniversary. The new  expansions feature characters from the Super Sentai, Kamen Rider, and Metal Hero Series, and other TV series based on works by Shotaro Ishinomori (Robocon, Kikaider, and Inazuman).

External links
 Rangers Strike

References

Card games introduced in 2006
Collectible card games
Kamen Rider
Metal Hero Series
Super Sentai